Anarchist Portraits is a 1988 history book by Paul Avrich about the lives and personalities of multiple prominent and inconspicuous anarchists.
Mikhail Bakunin
Peter Kropotkin
Chummy Fleming
Sergey Nechayev
Sacco and Vanzetti
Nestor Makhno
Eikhenbaum/Volin
Pierre-Joseph Proudhon
Anatoli Zhelezniakov
Mollie Steimer
Gustav Landauer
Ricardo Flores Magón
Paul Brousse
Charles Mowbray
Benjamin Tucker

References

External links 

 
 

1988 non-fiction books
American history books
Books by Paul Avrich
English-language books
History books about anarchism
History books about the United States
Princeton University Press books